TR/ST (previously known as Trust) is the Canadian electronic music project of Robert Alfons. It was formed as a band in 2010 when Alfons met Maya Postepski of Austra, but Postepski left in 2012. The project has spawned four albums so far: TRST (2012), Joyland (2014), The Destroyer (Part 1) and The Destroyer (Part 2) (2019). Alfons has also produced remixes for Feist, Moby, Zhala and Jonna Lee.

History

2010–2013: Formation and TRST
Alfons and Postepski met in late 2009, started writing songs together, and formed the band in January 2010, insisting that they were more than just an Austra side project. The band started out with Sacred Bones Records, releasing their debut single "Candy Walls" and "Bulbform" in 2011, on the strength of the former, they were signed to record label Arts & Crafts in the same year.

They released their critically acclaimed debut album TRST on 28 February 2012 on the Arts & Crafts label. Critic Luis-Enrique Arrazola of the National Post said (of their Toronto release party), "Trust gave an outstanding performance proving that they're an act worthy of all the hype. With a set far past midnight, they're the perfect ending to a wild night in the city, taking you on a relentless trip through a set list dripping with sexual tension before winding down to the last pulses of the synthesizer."

Larry Fitzmaurice of Pitchfork rated the album 7.4 out of 10 saying "... I quite like Alfons' voice; it has a slithering, grimy quality to it that increases the raunch-factor on particularly dirty-sounding tracks like "Shoom" and "Bulbform", and when he struts his stuff on "Sulk" and "Dressed for Space", he sounds like the kind of personality-heavy singer indie culture's been hesitant to embrace over the last few years." It was listed at number eight on Insound's Top Albums of 2012 and at number thirty-seven on Under the Radars Top 50 Albums of 2012.

Soon after the release of the album Postepski left the band to focus on Austra's growing commitments and her own solo project 'Princess Century'.

2014–2015: Joyland

Joyland was released on 3 March 2014 by Arts & Crafts. The album received generally favorable reviews. MusicOMH gave it a score 4 out of 5, describing the album as doing an "excellent job of sharpening and streamlining Trust’s sound into something even better than that displayed on the debut." The album debuted at No. 12 on the Billboard Dance/Electronic Albums chart.

It was promoted by three singles: "Rescue, Mister" accompanied by a music video directed by Sabrina Ratté, "Capitol" with a music video directed by Will Joines, and "Are We Arc?" accompanied by a music video directed by Malcolm Pate.

On 13 March 2015, Alfons released the single "Slug".

2016–present: The Destroyer
In Summer 2016, Robert Alfons confirmed that the upcoming third studio album was "being finished late last month". The album was set to be released in 2017 but the release date was delayed. The album was created in a 150-year-old farmhouse near the north of Toronto and in Los Angeles.

On 14 July 2017, Robert Alfons released "Bicep", the first single promoting the upcoming album. On 6 December 2017, the artist premiered music video for "Destroyer". The clip was directed by Justin Tyler Close and Ryan Heffington In the following year, TR/ST collaborated with singer ionnalee on the song "Harvest" for the album Everyone Afraid to Be Forgotten.

On 5 February 2019, TR/ST released a video for the single "Gone" and announced an upcoming two-part album The Destroyer, with a release date of 19 April 2019 for the first collection of songs, followed by three singles, "Unbleached", released in February "Grouch", released in March and "Colossal", released in April. The record marked the return of former member Maya Postepski as a collaborator.

On 25 July 2019, Robert Alfons released the second single, "Iris", off his fourth studio album The Destroyer (Part 2). The track was produced by Alfons, mixed and additionally produced by Damian Taylor and live drums were played by Lia Braswell. On the same day, the artist announced the release of the album, release date and artwork credits via Instagram with the digital pre-order being available on iTunes. The track was followed by other three singles: "Destroyer", officially released on 29 August 2019 and premiered on Flood Magazine, "The Stain", released on 19 September 2019 and premiered on Magnetic, and "Cor", released on 10 October 2019 and teased on YouTube before the premiere. In contrast to the industrial sound and immediacy of The Destroyer, follow up release The Destroyer (Part 2) is primarily a dream pop and ambient album with arrangements that differ from earlier TR/ST releases.

Members
Current members
Robert Alfons – music production, vocals (2010-present)

Former members
Maya Postepski – music production (2010–2012), live drums (2010–2012)

Current session/touring members
Esther Blue – keyboards (2013–present)
Lia Braswell – drums (2019–present)

Former session/touring members
unknown name – keyboards (2012)
Anne Gauthier – drums (2013–2018)
Maya Postepski – session music production (2017–2019), live keyboards (2019)

TimelineRobert Alfons' (born 11 April 1987) is a Canadian singer, songwriter and record producer of TR/ST from Winnipeg, Canada. His voice has been described as "soul-piercing", "sluggish" and having a "slithering, grimy quality."

During live performances, Alfons is accompanied by Lia Braswell (before 2019, it was Anne Gauthier) and Esther Blue that play drums and keyboards respectively.

Discography

Studio albums

Singles

Guest appearances

Remixes

References

External links
 
 TR/ST on Bandcamp

Canadian musical duos
Canadian synthpop groups
Musical groups established in 2010
Musical groups from Toronto
2010 establishments in Ontario
Canadian dark wave musical groups
Electropop groups
Cold wave groups
Sacred Bones Records artists
Arts & Crafts Productions artists
Royal Mountain Records artists